Emerging Infectious Diseases (EID) is an open-access, peer-reviewed journal published by the Centers for Disease Control and Prevention (CDC). EID is a public domain journal and covers global instances of new and reemerging infectious diseases, putting greater emphasis on disease emergence, prevention, control, and elimination. According to Journal Citation Reports, the journal's 2016 impact factor is 6.99, ranking it 4th out of 82 journals in the infectious disease category. The journal also has a 2016 Google Scholar h5-index score of 79, ranking it 2nd in both the epidemiology category and among open-access epidemiological journals, as well as 4th in the communicable diseases category and 1st among open-access communicable disease journals.

Abstracting and Indexing 
The journal is indexed in PubMed, MEDLINE, Web of Science: Science Citation Index Expanded, and Scopus.

The journal has a 2021 impact factor of 16.162.

References

External links 

EID on Social Media

Open access journals
Microbiology journals
Monthly journals
Publications established in 1995
English-language journals
Centers for Disease Control and Prevention
Academic journals published by the United States government